Cecil Clay (February 13, 1842 – September 23, 1903) was captain of Company K in the 58th Pennsylvania Volunteer Infantry Regiment in the Union Army during the American Civil War. He performed gallantly while wounded, earning the Medal of Honor for his actions during the assault and capture of Fort Harrison, Virginia in the Confederate defenses of Richmond, Virginia on September 29, 1864. He was later chief clerk of the United States Department of Justice.

Early life
Cecil Clay was born in Philadelphia, Pennsylvania on February 13, 1842. As an undergraduate at the University of Pennsylvania, he joined the fraternity St. Anthony Hall.

Civil war
Cecil Clay was first lieutenant on September 1, 1861 and captain on January 1, 1862 of company K of the 58th Regiment, Pennsylvania Volunteer Infantry. He was promoted to Major on September 30, 1864 and to Lieutenant Colonel on November 19, 1864.

Clay earned the Medal of Honor while serving with the 58th Pennsylvania on September 29, 1864 at Fort Harrison, Virginia, where he was wounded in action, losing his right arm and severely wounded in the left arm while leading a charge, carrying the colors of another regiment.  The medal was actually issued on April 19, 1892.

Clay was mustered out of the volunteer service on January 24, 1866. On February 24, 1866, President Andrew Johnson nominated Clay for appointment to the brevet grade of brigadier general of volunteers, to rank from March 13, 1865, and the U.S. Senate confirmed the appointment on April 10, 1866.

Later life
After the war, Clay became a lumber merchant. He was President of the St. Lawrence Boom and Manufacturing Company in 1870. From 1883 to 1903, he was chief clerk and general Agent, United States Department of Justice. He was a colonel in the 2nd [regiment] D.C. National Guard, 1887–1897. He also was President, Board of Reform School, Washington, D.C.

He was elected Companion No. 00149 in the Military Order of the Loyal Legion of the United States (MOLLUS), through the Commandery of Pennsylvania, on February 7, 1866. He later became a charter member of the Commandery of the District of Columbia, when it formed in 1882. The MOLLUS was the first post-Civil War veterans' organization, founded by and for commissioned officers of the Union armed forces.

Medal of Honor citation
Rank and organization: Captain, Company K, 58th Pennsylvania Infantry. Place and date: At Fort Harrison, Va., September 29, 1864. Entered service at:––––––. Birth: Philadelphia, Pa. Date of issue: April 19, 1892.

Citation:

Led his regiment in the charge, carrying the colors of another regiment, and when severely wounded in the right arm, incurring loss of same, he shifted the colors to the left hand, which also became disabled by a gunshot wound.

Death
Cecil Clay died September 23, 1907 at Washington, D.C. He is buried at Arlington National Cemetery, Virginia.

See also

 List of Medal of Honor recipients
 List of American Civil War Medal of Honor recipients: A–F

Notes

References
 Eicher, John H., and David J. Eicher. Civil War High Commands. Stanford, CA: Stanford University Press, 2001. .
 "Register of the Commandery of the State of Pennsylvania, April 15, 1865 – September 1, 1902". Philadelphia, 1902.

External links

 

Union Army officers
United States Army Medal of Honor recipients
1842 births
1903 deaths
Union Army generals
Military personnel from Philadelphia
Burials at Arlington National Cemetery
American Civil War recipients of the Medal of Honor